Health is an Australian television series aired in 1959 on ABC. It was an educational series intended to be viewed in schools. Four episodes were produced. It aired in a 20-minute time-slot.

Episode list
"Water Safety"
"Resuscitation"
"You're Growing Up"
"You're Growing Up, Part 2"

References

External links
 

1950s Australian documentary television series
1959 Australian television series debuts
1959 Australian television series endings
Australian Broadcasting Corporation original programming
English-language television shows
Black-and-white Australian television shows